Visvaldas Marijus Mažonas (born August 25, 1941, in Šiauliai) is a controversial figure of the radical right-wing political movement in Lithuania. He was a leader of a branch of the Lithuanian Patriotic Union (Lietuvos patriotų sąjunga) in Kaunas and participated in the 2004 election to the Seimas (Lithuanian Parliament).

Before plunging into politics, Mažonas held various jobs as a policeman, driver, security guard, and construction worker. He entered the political scene after the impeachment of Rolandas Paksas, former President of Lithuania. During the impeachment, Mažonas supported Paksas, attended various protest meetings, and vowed to "maintain order". During one incident, when he attempted to "keep order", Mažonas hit a high school student, who opposed Paksas. The event attracted media attention and Mažonas faced criminal charges (eventually reduced to misdemeanor). Paksas did not immediately distance himself from Mažonas.

Mažonas is known for disorderly conduct, provocations, insulting speeches, threats to overthrow the government, and displaying stylized Nazi swastikas. He and his supporters often wear black uniforms. During the trial of the suspected Holocaust perpetrator Algimantas Dailidė, Mažonas held signs supporting Dailidė. In another incident, he protested a monument to Danielius Dolskis, a Lithuanian Jew. Mažonas often collaborates with another extremist, Mindaugas Murza.

References

1941 births
Living people
People from Šiauliai
Lithuanian politicians
Far-right politics in Lithuania